Strathmore RFC is a rugby union club based in Forfar, Scotland. The club play their home matches at Inchmacoble Park. The club also fields a rugby league team, the Strathmore Silverbacks.

Junior section

The club run a Junior team named Strathmore Sharks.

Led by Strathmore Community Rugby Trust, the club - together with Brechin RFC, the Scottish Rugby Union and Scotland Rugby League - support a rugby academy for male and female school pupils of Forfar Academy, Webster's High in Kirriemuir and Brechin High.

Sevens

The club run the Strathmore Sevens tournament.

Notable players

Women

Scotland Internationalists

  Suzy Newton

Men

Midlands District players

Scotland Rugby League Internationalists

{| style="width:100%;"
|-
|  style="vertical-align:top; width:20%;"|
  Murray Mitchell

Honours

 Midlands League
 Champions (1): 1978
 Caledonia League Division One
 Champions (4): 2007, 2008, 2011, 2019

References

Scottish rugby union teams
Forfar
Rugby union in Angus, Scotland
1933 establishments in Scotland
Rugby clubs established in 1933